The following are lists of Malayalam films of the 2010s, by year released.

List of Malayalam films of 2010
List of Malayalam films of 2011
List of Malayalam films of 2012
List of Malayalam films of 2013
List of Malayalam films of 2014
List of Malayalam films of 2015
List of Malayalam films of 2016
List of Malayalam films of 2017
List of Malayalam films of 2018
List of Malayalam films of 2019

See  also
 List of highest-grossing Malayalam films

2010s
Malayalam
Malayalam